Lagansky District (Laganya rayon) is an administrative and municipal district (raion), one of the thirteen in the Republic of Kalmykia, Russia. It is located in the southeast of the republic. Its administrative center is the town of Lagan. As of the 2010 Census, the total population of the district was 20,089, with the population of Lagan accounting for 71.3% of that number.

History
The district was established in 1935. Until 1995, it was called Kaspiysky (Russian: , lit. "Caspian"; Kalmyk: , Kaspijsk rajon).

Administrative and municipal status
Within the framework of administrative divisions, Lagansky District is one of the thirteen in the Republic of Kalmykia. It is divided into one town (an administrative division with the administrative center in the town (an inhabited locality) of Lagan) and three rural administrations, which comprise five rural localities. As a municipal division, the district is incorporated as Lagansky Municipal District. The Town of Lagan is incorporated as an urban settlement, and the three rural administration are incorporated as four rural settlements within the municipal district. The town of Lagan serves as the administrative center of both the administrative and municipal district.

References

Notes

Sources



Districts of Kalmykia
 
States and territories established in 1935